Lampadena speculigera is a species of lanternfish in the subfamily Lampanyctinae. It is a mesopelagic fish that is found in the Atlantic, Indian, and Pacific Oceans. Its vernacular name is mirror lanternfish.

Description
The body is elongate and glossy, purplish brown in colour.

Ecology

Lanternfishes in general are preyed upon by a range of fish, squid, seabirds, and mammals. Predators of Lampadena speculigera in particular include northern fulmars.

References

Myctophidae
Fish of the Atlantic Ocean
Fish of the Indian Ocean
Fish of the Pacific Ocean
Taxa named by Tarleton Hoffman Bean
Taxa named by George Brown Goode
Fish described in 1896